Rock On! is an album by the American musician Del Shannon, released posthumously in 1991.

Production
The album was produced by Mike Campbell and Jeff Lynne. It was mostly completed when Shannon committed suicide, in February 1990. Tom Petty and some of the Heartbreakers played on Rock On! Richard Greene played fiddle on "Let's Dance". "What Kind of Fool Do You Think I Am?" is a cover of the Tams song.

Critical reception

The Calgary Herald lamented that "you'll hear a tired-sounding old rocker making one more half-hearted stab at a comeback." The Edmonton Journal noted that "Shannon was always a first-class writer of merry melodies and ringing country guitar licks that poured upbeat empathy on our saddest moments." The Indianapolis Star panned the production, writing that "the 10 songs are Electric Light Orchestra layered over '60s-style rock."

Track listing

Personnel
 Del Shannon – vocals, guitar
 Jeff Lynne – guitar, keyboards, bass guitar, backing vocals
 Mike Campbell – guitar, keyboards, bass guitar, backing vocals
 Tom Petty – guitar, backing vocals
 Benmont Tench – accordion, organ, piano
 Howie Epstein – backing vocals
 Phil Jones – drums, backing vocals
 Richard Greene – fiddle
 Phil Hatton – backing vocals
 Randy Jones – backing vocals
 Andrew Williams – backing vocals
 David Williams – backing vocals
 David Campbell – string arrangement

Production:
 Jeff Lynne – producer
 Mike Campbell – producer, engineer
 William Bottrell  – engineer
 Richard Dodd – engineer, mixing
 Mark Linett – engineer, mixing
 Bill Bottrell – mixing

References

Del Shannon albums
1991 albums
MCA Records albums
Albums published posthumously
Albums arranged by David Campbell (composer)
Albums produced by Jeff Lynne